Diego Bejarano Ibáñez (born 24 August 1991) is a Bolivian  who plays as a right back or defensive midfielder for Bolívar.

Career

Club
Panetolikos official website announced that the Bolivian international midfielder Diego Bejarano signed a three-year contract with the club as a free agent. Bejarano has international experience at club level as he played in two consecutive years in Copa Libertadores. Bejarano debuted professionally in the Bolivian giant The Strongest, from which he played on loan to Guabirá for the 2012 season, as he was not in the plans of his manager Mauricio Soria.

On 22 September 2014, he debuted in the Greek Super League with the club, in a 1-0 home loss against PAOK. In April 2015, Bejarano in an interview stated that is enjoyed the first eight months in European football, so he wants to stay many years playing football in Europe. His impressive displays against the giants of Greek Super League, named Olympiacos, Panathinaikos and PAOK was an asset for his club, but also attracted their interest."I am satisfied so far, I have played 25 games out of 32 for the club and scored two goals". His agent, Argentinian Alejandro de Bartolo stated that "as the Greek league ends on 10 May, we will see whether he stays at the club or move to another Greek club". Bejarano stated that "...although the Greek Super League is not the most popular league in Europe and his club is not the most popular, fans are very passionate and often games are played to packed stadiums."
Panetolikos defensive midfielder will be in contention for the first two games in the Superleague Greece play-offs as he is set to travel to Bolivia late in May in order to start preparations for the Copa America. The Bolivian midfielder revealed that he will fly to his homeland on 27 May in order to be in contention with his National Team ahead of the tournament in Latin America which goes underway two weeks later.

On 5 January 2016, Panetolikos announced that Bejarano would be returning to Bolivia for six months to play for The Strongest.

International
Bejarano has represented Bolivia at youth level. On 15 November 2012, Bejarano debuted for the Bolivia National team in 1–1 friendly international home draw against Costa Rica. As of 7 June 2016, Bejarano earned 13 caps for Bolivia and he represented his country in 6 FIFA World Cup qualification matches.

International goals
Scores and results list Bolivia's goal tally first.

Honours
Liga de Fútbol Profesional Boliviano: The Strongest Apertura 2013, 2014

References

External links

 

1991 births
Living people
Sportspeople from Santa Cruz de la Sierra
Bolivian footballers
Bolivia international footballers
Association football midfielders
The Strongest players
Guabirá players
Panetolikos F.C. players
Club Bolívar players
Bolivian expatriate footballers
Expatriate footballers in Greece
Super League Greece players
Copa América Centenario players
2019 Copa América players
2021 Copa América players
Bolivian Primera División players